Dorothy Elias-Fahn (born March 13 in California), formerly known as Dorothy Melendrez, is an American voice actress. Some of her prominent lead roles include Meryl Stryfe in Trigun, Sayaka Maizono, Chihiro Fujisaki, and Tsumugi Shirogane from the Danganronpa series, Kamiya Kaoru in Rurouni Kenshin, Naru Narusegawa in Love Hina, Tomoe Kashiwaba in Rozen Maiden, Nina Purpleton in Mobile Suit Gundam 0083 and Chizuru Minamoto in Kanokon.

Personal life 
Elias-Fahn is married to fellow actor Tom Fahn. They have one daughter.

Filmography

Animation

Video games

Dubbing roles

Anime

Film

Video games

Live action

References

 Bibliography

External links
 
 Dorothy Elias-Fahn interview at 91.8 the Fan.
 
 Dorothy Melendrez and Dorothy Fahn at CrystalAcids Anime Voice Actor Database

1962 births
Actresses from California
American video game actresses
American voice actresses
Living people
20th-century American actresses
21st-century American actresses